Michael Hogan (1853 – 6 December 1935) was an Irish nationalist politician and a Member of Parliament (MP) for North Tipperary from 1906 to 1910.

He was elected unopposed as an Irish Parliamentary Party MP for North Tipperary at the 1906 general election, and re-elected unopposed at the January 1910 general election. He did not contest the December 1910 general election.

He died on 6 December 1935.

References

External links

1853 births
1935 deaths
Members of the Parliament of the United Kingdom for County Tipperary constituencies (1801–1922)
UK MPs 1906–1910
UK MPs 1910
People from County Tipperary
Irish Parliamentary Party MPs